Aanakkorumma is a 1985 Indian Malayalam film,  directed and produced by M. Mani. The film stars Ratheesh, Adoor Bhasi, Sankaradi and Menaka in the lead roles. The film has musical score by Shyam and V. D. Rajappan.

Cast
Ratheesh as Devan
M. G. Soman as Swami/Police Officer
Adoor Bhasi as Raman Nair
Santhosh as Vikraman
Sankaradi as Potti
Menaka as Devi
Baby Shalini as Bindu
V. D. Rajappan as Balan
Kunchan as Govindan
Thrissur Elsy as Meenakshi
Poojappura Ravi as Narayana Pilla
Paravoor Bharathan as Police officer
Thikkurussy Sukumaran Nair as Minister
KPAC Azeez as Police Inspector
Anuradha as Anitha

Soundtrack

The music was composed by Shyam and V. D. Rajappan and the lyrics were written by V. D. Rajappan and Chunakkara Ramankutty.

References

External links
 

1985 films
1980s Malayalam-language films
Films directed by M. Mani